The Telen or Tel River is a tributary of the Mahanadi in East Central India. The Bhede River is a tributary to this river. The historical Kolabira Fort is situated on the bank of this river. Jharsuguda town lies on the bank of this river.

References

Rivers of Jharkhand
Tributaries of the Mahanadi River
Rivers of Odisha
Rivers of India